P. U. Ratnatunga was the 28th Surveyor General of Sri Lanka. He was appointed in 1967, succeeding F. H. Gunasekara, and held the office until 1968. He was succeeded by C. T. Goonawardana.

References

R